Ponderosa Pine is a census-designated place (CDP) in Bernalillo County, New Mexico, United States. The population was 1,195 at the 2010 census. It is part of the Albuquerque Metropolitan Statistical Area.

Geography
Ponderosa Pine is located in southeastern Bernalillo County. It is bordered to the north by the Cedro census-designated place, and to the west by Cibola National Forest. New Mexico State Road 337 leads through the community, leading north  to Tijeras and Interstate 40.

Demographics

Education
It is zoned to Albuquerque Public Schools.

References

Census-designated places in Bernalillo County, New Mexico
Census-designated places in New Mexico
Albuquerque metropolitan area